Adrián Holešinský (born 11 February 1996) is a Slovak professional ice hockey player for HC Škoda Plzeň of the Czech Extraliga.

International play
He was selected to make his full IIHF international debut, participating for Slovakia in the 2021 IIHF World Championship.

Career statistics

Regular season and playoffs

International

References

External links

1996 births
Living people
Slovak ice hockey forwards
People from Čadca
Sportspeople from the Žilina Region
MsHK Žilina players
HC Plzeň players
HKM Zvolen players
HK Nitra players
Ice hockey players at the 2022 Winter Olympics
Olympic ice hockey players of Slovakia
Medalists at the 2022 Winter Olympics
Olympic bronze medalists for Slovakia
Olympic medalists in ice hockey
Slovak expatriate ice hockey players in the Czech Republic
Slovak expatriate ice hockey players in the United States
Slovak expatriate ice hockey players in Finland
Slovak expatriate ice hockey players in Sweden